Swinton railway station serves the towns of Swinton and Pendlebury in the City of Salford, Greater Manchester, England. It is actually located in Pendlebury and not Swinton itself; the boundary between the two districts is about 40 yards further down Station Road (B5231), beyond the junction with Boundary Road and nearer the town centre. It opened, along with the line to passenger trains, in June 1887.

Swinton is on the Manchester to Southport Line. Onward trains take passengers on to Southport, although occasional services are direct.

Although the station is in the City of Salford, rather than Manchester, the name Swinton (Manchester) is used by National Rail to refer to the station; this is to avoid confusion with Swinton railway station in South Yorkshire.

Facilities
Swinton station has relatively basic facilities. For example, the ticket office is only open until 12:50 on weekdays and 13:50 on Saturdays; it is closed on Sundays. When closed, one must purchase tickets on board the train or on-line. A screen in the booking hall lists live departure times of the trains showing any delays or cancellations; screens are also now installed in the centre of the island platform, showing live train departure information to commuters waiting on the platforms.

An intercom unit is also installed on the platform which passengers can use in the event of an emergency or if they need help or information when the station is unstaffed. As the ticket office is at street level on the bridge above, and is connected to the platforms via a staircase, no step-free access is available for wheelchair or mobility-impaired users.

Service

Passengers for stations to Southport need to change at Wigan, as only a limited number run through on weekdays since the May 2019 timetable change.

A normal service operates on most bank holidays.

Reinstatement of Sunday service

During much of the 1970s, 1980s, 1990s and 2000s, there were no Sunday services serving Swinton. After several years of successful lobbying from passenger user groups and station friends' groups, Northern Rail introduced a 12-month trial Sunday service beginning on 23 May 2010 with the funding support from Greater Manchester Passenger Transport Executive.

The service still continues to operate in the spring 2021 timetable and is included in the new Northern franchise agreement that came into effect in April 2016.

References

External links

Friends of Walkden Station - One of the main lobbying groups

Former Lancashire and Yorkshire Railway stations
Railway stations in Salford
DfT Category E stations
Northern franchise railway stations
Swinton, Greater Manchester
Railway stations in Great Britain opened in 1887